PD-0298029 is a drug which acts as a selective antagonist for the muscarinic acetylcholine receptor M4. It was developed for the treatment of Parkinson's disease, but poor bioavailability and rapid metabolism in animal studies have meant its use is largely limited to in vitro research into the M4 and other muscarinic receptors.

See also
 PD-102,807

References 

Parkinson's disease
Muscarinic antagonists